Andriy Oleksandrovych Totovytskyi (born 20 January 1993) is a Ukrainian professional footballer who plays as a midfielder for Shakhtar Donetsk.

Career

Shakhtar Donetsk

Loan to Illichivets Mariupol
From June 2013, he played for FC Illichivets Mariupol, on loan from Shakhtar Donetsk.

Loan to Zorya Luhansk
In 2015, he was loaned to Zorya Luhansk, which placed 7th in the 2015–16 Ukrainian Premier League and reached the final of the 2015–16 Ukrainian Cup.

Loan to Kortrijk
In August 2016, he was loaned to Kortrijk.

2018–19 season
In 2018–19, he played on the Shakhtar Donetsk team that won the 2018–19 Ukrainian Premier League and the Ukrainian Cup.

Desna Chernihiv
In 2020, he moved to Desna Chernihiv, signing a contract for 2 years. 

On 27 September 2020, he scored a penalty against Rukh Lviv at Chernihiv Stadium, which was his first Ukrainian Premier League appearance for the club. 

On 21 February 2021, he debuted as captain of Desna Chernihiv against Dynamo Kyiv at Valeriy Lobanovskyi Dynamo Stadium. On 10 April, he scored two goals against Oleksandriya, and won player of the week honours.

Kolos Kovalivka
In December 2021, he moved to Kolos Kovalivka in the Ukrainian Premier League.

Return to Shakhtar Donetsk
In July 2022, he returned to Shakhtar Donetsk.

Outside of professional football
In March 2022, during the Siege of Chernihiv, Totovytskyi held a charity auction on his Instagram page. Viewers had the opportunity to compete for a T-shirt of one of the Chernihiv favorites. In addition, the footballer promised the winner would receive new shoes as a bonus.

Career statistics

Club

Honours
Shakhtar Donetsk
 Ukrainian Premier League: 2016–17, 2018–19

 Ukrainian Cup: 2018–19

 Ukrainian Super Cup: runner up 2018

Zorya Luhansk
 Ukrainian Cup: runner-up 2015-16

Ukraine U21
 Commonwealth of Independent States Cup: 2014

Individual
 Desna Chernihiv Player of the Year of season 2020–21
 Best player of Round 21 in the 2020–21 season

References

External links
 Profile on Official FC Desna Chernihiv website
 
 
 
 Totovytskyi - Instagram

1993 births
Living people
Piddubny Olympic College alumni
Ukrainian footballers
Association football midfielders
FC Shakhtar Donetsk players
FC Shakhtar-3 Donetsk players
FC Mariupol players
FC Zorya Luhansk players
K.V. Kortrijk players
FC Desna Chernihiv players
FC Kolos Kovalivka players
Ukrainian Premier League players
Ukrainian Second League players
Belgian Pro League players
Ukrainian expatriate footballers
Expatriate footballers in Belgium
Ukrainian expatriate sportspeople in Belgium
Sportspeople from Rivne Oblast
Ukraine youth international footballers
Ukraine under-21 international footballers